Ramya is a given name.

Ramya may also refer to:

 Ramya (actress) or Divya Spandana (born 1982), Indian film actress and politician

See also
 "Ramaya", a 1975 song by Afric Simone
 Ramyah, a village in Lebanon